Herr Birger Persson (sometimes Petersson) of Finsta (??? - 3 April 1327) was a Swedish magnate, knight, privy councillor and Uppland's first lawspeaker.  He was a co-drafter of the Law of Uppland, and father of Saint Bridget of Sweden. He was also son of the knight Per Israelsson. 

Birger is portrayed with several coats of arms. According to the tombstone in Uppsala Cathedral, his shield showed two lowered wings, close together, without major gaps. But his seal in medieval letters shows two wings, the upper base of which is well separated, at large intervals, between a six-leafed rose, which hangs in a garland-like object.

References

Further reading
 Brilioth, Yngve: "Birger Petersson" in Svenskt biografiskt lexikon (1924), vol. 4, pp. 436–439
 Bengt Hildebrand, "Finsta-ätten", in Svenskt biografiskt lexikon, vol. 16, pp. 51 f.
 Jarl Gallén, with contribution from A. Filip Liljeholm, "Finstaätten" in Äldre svenska frälsesläkter, vol. 1:1 (1957), pp. 34–38

Swedish landlords
Swedish landowners
14th-century Swedish lawyers
Medieval knights
Byzantine letter writers
Byzantine law
Year of birth missing
Year of birth unknown
1327 deaths